The 1911–12 Northern Rugby Football Union season was the 17th season of rugby league football.

Season summary

Huddersfield finished the regular season as league leaders and then went on to claim their first Championship by defeating Wigan 13-5 in the play-off final.

The Challenge Cup Winners were Dewsbury who defeated Oldham 8-5.

Merthyr Tydfil dropped out of the league.

Huddersfield's Australian winger Albert Rosenfeld set a new record for tries in a season with 76.

Wigan won the Lancashire League, and Huddersfield won the Yorkshire League. Rochdale Hornets beat Oldham 12–5 to win the Lancashire Cup, and Huddersfield beat Hull Kingston Rovers 22–10 to win the Yorkshire County Cup.

Championship

Championship play-off

Challenge Cup

Dewsbury defeated Oldham 8-5 at Leeds in front of a crowd of 15,271 to win their first Challenge Cup in their first Final appearance.

Sources
1911-12 Rugby Football League season at wigan.rlfans.com
The Challenge Cup at The Rugby Football League website

References

1911 in English rugby league
1912 in English rugby league
Northern Rugby Football Union seasons
1911 in Welsh rugby league
1912 in Welsh rugby league